Ratkuria is a village in Bhopalgarh tehsil, Jodhpur district, Rajasthan, India located at . Its PIN code is 342606. It is the location of a Ch. Gullaram Government Senior Secondary School.

References

Villages in Jodhpur district